Luca Valentin Herrmann (born 20 February 1999) is a German professional footballer who plays as a midfielder for  club Dynamo Dresden.

Club career
Herrmann was born in Freiburg im Breisgau. After playing youth football for PSV Freiburg, Herrmann switched to SC Freiburg's youth academy in 2011. Having made his senior debut for SC Freiburg II in August 2017, he played 69 times for the reserve side, scoring 8 goals. He signed for Dynamo Dresden on a three-year contract in June 2021.

International career
Herrmann has represented Germany at under-15, under-16 and under-19 levels.

References

External links

1999 births
Living people
German footballers
Sportspeople from Freiburg im Breisgau
Footballers from Baden-Württemberg
Association football midfielders
Germany youth international footballers
2. Bundesliga players
Regionalliga players
SC Freiburg II players
Dynamo Dresden players